The Transfer Agreement: The Dramatic Story of the Pact Between the Third Reich and Jewish Palestine is a book written by author Edwin Black, documenting the transfer agreement ("Haavara Agreement" in Hebrew) between Zionist organizations and Nazi Germany to transfer a number of Jews and their assets to Palestine.  Shortly after Samuel Untermyer's return to the U.S. from Germany in 1933, articles appeared on the front page of newspapers in London and New York declaring that "Judea declares war on Germany". This resulted in an effective boycott of German goods in many countries, affecting German exports significantly. The agreement was partly inspired by this boycott which appeared to threaten the Reich.  Controversial as it may be seen in hindsight, it marked one of the few rescues of Jews and their assets in the years leading up to the Holocaust.

Main thesis

This book documents the agreement between Nazi Germany and an organization of German Zionists in 1933 to salvage some German Jewish assets and the voluntary emigration of German Jews to Palestine before the Third Reich implemented expulsion and then extermination. The Transfer Agreement rescued some 60,000 German Jews. A sweeping, worldwide economic boycott of Germany by Jews helped spur a deal between the Nazis and Zionists.

The book also documents the controversy within the Zionist movement and Jewish diaspora over the agreement, which Black shows "tore apart the Jewish world in the pre-World War II era". In particular, it describes the conflict between, on one side, German Zionists and German-descended communal leaders in the US, who argued for the agreement, and, on the other side, the mainstream Eastern European-descended American Jewish Zionist leaders (such as the American Jewish Committee and Jewish War Veterans) who opposed the agreement and argued instead for a full boycott of Nazi Germany.

Controversy
The book was met with criticism on multiple fronts. Historian Richard S. Levy in Commentary wrote, "[Black] relies on outmoded secondary works, makes numerous errors, and distorts his subject [...] Black’s neglect of the secondary scholarly literature is perverse and leads him to his most serious error of judgment—drastic overestimation of the political and economic efficacy of the boycott weapon." He further described the book as "conspiracy-mongering, innuendo, and sensationalism."

Awards
 1985 Carl Sandburg Award of the Friends of the Chicago Public Library for best non-fiction book of 1984 for the book The Transfer Agreement.

See also
 IBM and the Holocaust
 Zionism in the Age of the Dictators
 51 Documents: Zionist Collaboration with the Nazis

References

History books about the Holocaust
1984 non-fiction books

fr:The Transfer Agreement